Tvarditsa may refer to:

Tvarditsa, Sliven Province, capital of Tvarditsa Municipality, Bulgaria
Tvarditsa, Burgas Province, Bulgaria
Tvarditsa, Dobrich Province, Bulgaria
Tvarditsa Municipality, Bulgaria
Tvardița, town in Moldova
Tvarditsa Rocks, off the South Shetland Islands, Antarctica